The  2011 Euroleague Final Four was the concluding EuroLeague Final Four tournament of the Euroleague 2010–11 season. It was held on May 6–8, 2011. All of the games were held at the Palau Sant Jordi, in Barcelona, Spain. Panathinaikos won its 6th EuroLeague championship. Dimitris Diamantidis was named the Final Four MVP.

Bracket

All times are CEST (UTC+2).

Semifinal 1

Semifinal 2

Third-place playoff

Final

External links
Official Site

Final Four
2010–11
2010–11 in Greek basketball
2010–11 in Italian basketball
2010–11 in Spanish basketball
2010–11 in Israeli basketball
International basketball competitions hosted by Spain
International basketball competitions hosted by Catalonia
Sports competitions in Barcelona